One Body Too Many is a 1944 American comedy-mystery film directed by Frank McDonald, starring Bela Lugosi, Jack Haley and Lyle Talbot.

Plot
A timid insurance salesman Albert L. Tuttle (Jack Haley) visits eccentric millionaire Cyrus J. Rutherford, intent on selling him a $200,000 insurance deal. Instead he finds that Rutherford has recently died and his mansion is now full of relatives who are, according to the will, all bound to remain in the mansion until a glass-domed vault is constructed on the roof, to house the deceased millionaire who was an ardent follower of the stars. Tuttle is mistaken for a private detective sent to guard the body, and once the confusion is cleared up and the real detective fails to show, he is persuaded by Rutherford's niece Carol Dunlap (Jean Parker) to remain and ensure that the body is not stolen. If the body should be buried any place other than the vault, the will states that recipients who would receive the largest request will receive the smallest, and vice versa. One of the recipients plans to reverse the will in their favor, hide the body and kill anyone who gets in their way. Unfortunately for mild-mannered Tuttle, he is directly in the way of the killer, and the rest of the conniving family.

Cast
Jack Haley as Albert L. Tuttle
Jean Parker as Carol Dunlap
Bela Lugosi as Merkil, the butler
Blanche Yurka as Matthews
Lyle Talbot as Jim Davis
Douglas Fowley as Henry Rutherford
Fay Helm as Estelle Hopkins
Bernard Nedell as Attorney Morton Gellman
Lucien Littlefield as Kenneth Hopkins
Dorothy Granger as Mona Rutherford
Maxine Fife as Margaret Hopkins

Production
Pine-Thomas Productions originally specialised in action films but decided to move into comedy and signed Jack Haley to star in movies for the company of which this was the second.

Pine and Thomas originally wanted Boris Karloff for the key horror role. Frank McDonald signed to direct in December 1943, when it was known as Too Many Bodies. Eventually Bela Lugosi was signed.

See also
 List of films in the public domain in the United States

References

External links 

 
Review at Variety
 

1944 films
American comedy horror films
American black-and-white films
1940s English-language films
American independent films
Paramount Pictures films
American parody films
Films directed by Frank McDonald
Films set in country houses
1940s comedy horror films
American comedy mystery films
1940s comedy mystery films
1940s parody films
1944 horror films
1940s American films